Delray Beach Tennis Center is a tennis center  in Delray Beach, Florida.  Built in 1992, the stadium (part of the tennis center) currently holds 8,200 spectators. It currently hosts the Delray Beach Open.

It has hosted Fed Cup and Davis Cup matches. 

In 2006, the Palm Beach Phantoms indoor football team planned on playing there, which would have made the Tennis Center the first outdoor facility to host the normally indoor sporting event. However, no agreement was made with the team, which forced the Phantoms to play all of its games on the road. The team folded after the 2006 season with a record of 1–6.

See also
 List of tennis stadiums by capacity
International Tennis Championships

External links
 Davis Cup: USA vs. Sweden, April 2004
 Fed Cup: USA vs. Belgium, April 2005
 Wikimapia

Tennis venues in Florida
Delray Beach, Florida
Sports venues in Palm Beach County, Florida
1992 establishments in Florida
Sports venues completed in 1992